Hayley Bullas (born 23 September 1996) is an Australian rules footballer who played for the West Coast Eagles in the AFL Women's (AFLW). Bullas signed with West Coast during the first period of the 2019 expansion club signing period in August. She made her debut against  at Victoria Park in the opening round of the 2020 season.
 In November 2022, Bullas was delisted by West Coast Eagles.

References

External links 

1996 births
Living people
West Coast Eagles (AFLW) players
Australian rules footballers from Victoria (Australia)